The 1996 Southern Miss Golden Eagles football team represented the University of Southern Mississippi in the 1996 NCAA Division I-A football season. The Golden Eagles were led by seventh-year head coach Jeff Bower and played their home games at M. M. Roberts Stadium. In the inaugural season of Conference USA, Southern Miss claimed a share of the conference championship with Houston after finishing 4–1 in conference, and 8–3 overall.

Schedule

Roster

References

Southern Miss
Southern Miss Golden Eagles football seasons
Conference USA football champion seasons
Southern Miss Golden Eagles football